Family tree of the First Dynasty of Egypt, ruling ancient Egypt in the 32nd century BCE to the 30th century BCE.

Chart

 01
04
Family tree
32nd century BC in Egypt
31st century BC in Egypt
30th century BC in Egypt